Telemeter Glacier is a small glacier 1 mile (1.6 km) southwest of Fireman Glacier in the west part of Quartermain Mountains, Victoria Land, Antarctica. The name is one of a group in the area associated with surveying applied in 1993 by New Zealand Geographic Board (NZGB); telemeter being an instrument used to ascertain ranges and distances.

Glaciers of Scott Coast